Parcé-sur-Sarthe (literally Parcé on Sarthe) is a commune in the Sarthe department in the region of Pays de la Loire in north-western France.

Personalities linked to the commune 
 François Villon (1431-1463), poet, briefly imprisoned there as testified by a plaque.
 Claude Chappe (1763-1805), inventor of the semaphore telegraph. He made his first attempts passing messages between Brûlon and Parcé.
 Joseph-René Verdier (born 1819 in Parcé-sur-Sarthe - 1904), watercolourist and student of Auguste and Rosa Bonheur. His works include Étang au crépuscule, Petite Fille jouant avec un chien et Un Matin dans la lande (Musée du Mans).
 Marcel Pagnol (1895-1974), novelist, playwright and filmmaker, bought the Ignière mill in 1930, where he stayed, and which he sold twenty years later. Le Gendre de Monsieur Poirier was partly filmed in the region.
 François Dufeu (born in 1943 in Parcé), writer.

See also
Communes of the Sarthe department

References

Communes of Sarthe
Anjou